Avadh B. Saxena is an American physicist and currently the Group Leader of Physics of Condensed Matter and Complex Systems Group (T-4) at Los Alamos National Laboratory, New Mexico, United States. His contributions cover a range of topics including phase transitions, functional materials, topological defects such as solitons and skyrmions, and Non-Hermitian quantum mechanics. Saxena completed his PhD at the Temple University in 1986 (advisor: James D. Gunton). Subsequently, he held a joint postdoc position at the Materials Research Lab at Penn State (with Gerhard R. Barsch) and Cornell University (with James A. Krumhansl).  In 1990 he came to Los Alamos National Laboratory as a visiting scientist/consultant to the Theoretical Division (with Alan R. Bishop), and in 1993 became a Technical Staff Member. In January 2006 he assumed the Deputy Group Leader position of the Condensed Matter and Statistical Physics Group (formerly T-11) and since January 2009 he is the Group Leader of T-4. He is currently also an affiliate professor at the KTH Royal Institute of Technology, and adjunct professor at the University of Barcelona, University of Crete, Greece, Virginia Tech, and University of Arizona, and scientific advisor at the  National Institute for Materials Science at Tsukuba, Japan. He is a Fellow of Los Alamos National Laboratory, a Fellow of the American Physical Society (APS), and a member of the Sigma Xi Scientific Research Society and APS.

Academic career
Avadh has more than 475 publications with over 12,000 citations and an h-index of 54 (Google Scholar).  He has also co-edited 6 Springer books  in addition to several special journal issues. He is also slated to write a book on the topic of phase transitions in materials (Cambridge University Press). In addition, he has co-organized over 50 international conferences on various research topics.

His main research interests include phase transitions, optical, electronic, vibrational, transport and magnetic properties of functional materials, device physics, soft condensed matter, geometry, topology and nonlinear phenomena.  Recently he has been coordinating theoretical efforts at LANL in the context of Beyond Moore's Law quantum computing.

Saxena completed his PhD at the Temple University in 1986 under the supervision of James D. Gunton. In 1990 he was a visiting scientists at Los Alamos National Laboratory, becoming a Technical Staff Member in 1993. He is an affiliate professor at the KTH Royal Institute of Technology, and adjunct professor at the University of Barcelona, University of Crete, Greece, Virginia Tech, and University of Arizona. Avadh serves on many international advisory committees/boards, e.g., ICOMAT, CIMTEC, Deployable Quantum Computing, etc.

Most cited publications
Conformational dynamics of photoexcited conjugated moleculesBy: Tretiak, S; Saxena, A; Martin, RL; et al. Physical Review Letters  Volume:  89   Issue:  9     Article Number: 097402   Published:  AUG 26 2002 
2-Band Model for Halogen-Bridged Mixed-Valence Transition-Metal Complexes. 1. Ground-state and Excitation SpectrumBy: Gammel, JT; Saxenx, A; Batistic, I; et al. Physical Review B  Volume:  45   Issue:  12   Pages:  6408-6434   Published:  MAR 15 1992 
Efficient computation of the structural phase behavior of block copolymers By: Tzeremes, G; Rasmussen, KO; Lookman, T; et al. Physical Review E  Volume:  65   Issue:  4     Article Number: 041806   Part:  1   Published:  APR 2002 
Real-time observation of nonlinear coherent phonon dynamics in single-walled carbon nanotubes By: Gambetta, A.; Manzoni,  C.; Menna, E.; et al. NATURE PHYSICS Volume:  2   Issue:  8   Pages:  515-520   Published:  AUG 2006 
Molecular geometry fluctuation model for the mobility of conjugated polymers By: Yu, ZG; Smith, DL; Saxena, A; et al. Physical Review Letters  Volume:  84   Issue:  4   Pages:  721-724   Published:  JAN 24 2000 
Ferroelastic dynamics and strain compatibility By: Lookman, T; Shenoy, SR; Rasmussen, KO; et al. Physical Review B  Volume:  67   Issue:  2     Article Number: 024114   Published:  JAN 1 2003 
Particle model for skyrmions in metallic chiral magnets: Dynamics, pinning, and creep By: Lin, Shi-Zeng; Reichhardt, Charles; Batista, Cristian D.; et al. Physical Review B  Volume:  87   Issue:  21     Article Number: 214419   Published:  JUN 17 2013 
Martensitic textures: Multiscale consequences of elastic compatibility By: Shenoy, SR; Lookman, T; Saxena, A; et al. Physical Review B  Volume:  60   Issue:  18   Pages:  12537-12541   Published:  NOV 1 1999
Molecular geometry fluctuations and field-dependent mobility in conjugated polymers By: Yu, ZG; Smith, DL; Saxena, A; et al. Physical Review B  Volume:  63   Issue:  8     Article Number: 085202   Published:  FEB 15 2001 
Thermally activated avalanches: Jamming and the progression of needle domains By: Salje, E. K. H.; Ding, X.; Zhao, Z.; et al. Physical Review B  Volume:  83   Issue:  10     Article Number: 104109   Published:  MAR 25 2011

References

External links
 Official home page

Living people
Quantum physicists
Theoretical physicists
Los Alamos National Laboratory personnel
Indian physicists
Temple University alumni
Year of birth missing (living people)